Lifesigns are an English progressive rock band, first conceived by lead singer and keys player John Young in 2008. By 2014, the band's lineup included Steve Rispin as their sound engineer, Jon Poole on bass and vocals, Martin "Frosty" Beedle on drums, percussion and vocals, and formerly Niko Tsonev on guitars and vocals. After Tsonev departed the band in 2016, Dave Bainbridge joined on guitar and additional keys. Beedle left the band in 2020 and was replaced by Zoltán Csörsz.

The band are noted for their keyboard-driven melodic prog rock sound and pop rock influences. Lifesigns released their self-titled debut studio album in 2013. Their third and latest studio album, Altitude, was released in 2021.

History
Lifesigns was conceived in 2008 by John Young. Working together with sound engineer Steve Rispin, John started to lay the grounds for the Lifesigns album in 2008. In 2010, John was joined by longtime friend Nick Beggs on bass, Chapman Stick and background vocals, and by drummer Martin "Frosty" Beedle to complete the first lineup of the band.

The band worked for over two years to complete their self-titled debut album, with notable guest stars such as progressive rock legend Steve Hackett (Genesis), Jakko Jakszyk (King Crimson), Thijs Van Leer (from Focus) on flute, and Robin Boult (from Fish) on guitar. "Lifesigns" was released on 5 February 2013.

The band began live performances in 2014. As Nick Beggs was busy with other musical endeavors (notably touring with Steve Hackett), Jon Poole was recruited to handle bass and vocals, while Niko Tsonev (departed the band August 2016) took up the guitar duties. The band performed on the progressive "Cruise to the Edge" in the Spring of 2014, as well as appearances in England and continental Europe. In addition to the entire Lifesigns debut, other songs performed included material from the John Young Band, as well as new material.

In October 2015, Lifesigns released a live DVD titled Under the Bridge - Live in London, filmed at a venue beneath the Stamford Bridge stadium, over two nights in January of the same year. The project was crowdfunded via PledgeMusic.

In September 2017, Lifesigns released their second studio album, Cardington. The Prog Report described it as "a specific and customized alcove of prog that does not sound quite like anything else". It features recordings of "Different", "Impossible", and "Voice in My Head", and four new tracks. Cardington features guitarist Dave Bainbridge who subsequently joined the band's live lineup in June 2017. It was their second crowdfunded project, and they met their funding target within 48 hours of launching the campaign. The album reached no. 20 on the Independent Albums Chart and no. 76 on the Physical Albums Chart in the UK.

2018 has seen the band perform several live dates throughout the U.K., with further live dates in March/April 2019 on the Cruise to the Edge and in Europe.

On 15 January 2020, the band released a 4-track digital EP titled Lifesigns Music, featuring one track from each of their previous releases. A radio edit of "Impossible", which previously featured on Cardington, was released as a single with an accompanying music video.

On 9 June 2020 Frosty Beedle announced his departure from the band. Zoltán Csörsz (Flower Kings, Karmakanic) was announced as his replacement on 12 June 2020.

In 2021, Lifesigns released their third studio album, Altitude. It was produced during the COVID-19 pandemic and received financial support via an independent crowdfunding campaign. The album was first made available as a download, and a CD release followed on 8 March 2021. The band will embark on a European tour later in 2023, with a live album and a new studio album expected to follow.

Members 
Current members

 John Young – keyboards, lead vocals
 Jon Poole – bass guitar, vocals
 Zoltán Csörsz – drums, percussion
 Dave Bainbridge – guitar, keyboards
 Steve Rispin – sound engineer, production

Former members

 Nick Beggs – bass guitar, Chapman Stick, vocals (2010–2013)
 Niko Tsonev – guitar, vocals (2014–2016)
 Frosty Beedle – drums, percussion, vocals (2010–2020)

Discography

Studio
Lifesigns (2013)
Cardington (2017)
Altitude (2021)

Live
Under the Bridge - Live in London (DVD - 2015)

Gallery

References

External links

British progressive rock groups